Lewis and Clark Highway may refer to:

Lewis and Clark Trail, a named highway approximating the path of Lewis and Clark in 1804-1806
 Lewis and Clark Highway (Montana), a named highway in Montana

Lewis and Clark Highway may also refer to:

 Lewis and Clark National Historic Trail, a route roughly marking the path of Lewis and Clark's journey
 Northwest Passage Scenic Byway, a scenic byway in Idaho
 Lewis and Clark Back Country Byway, a scenic byway in Idaho
 Sacajawea Historic Byway, a scenic byway in Idaho
 Sakakawea Scenic Byway, a scenic byway in North Dakota
 Lewis & Clark Scenic Byway, a scenic byway in Nebraska

See also
 Lewis and Clark (disambiguation)

Highway